The Second Texas Legislature met from December 13, 1847 to March 20, 1848 in regular session. All members of the House of Representatives and about half of the members of the Senate were elected in 1847.

Sessions
 2nd Regular session: December 13, 1847 – March 20, 1848

Party summary

Officers

Senate
 Lieutenant Governor John Alexander Greer, Democrat
 President pro tempore Edward Burleson, Democrat

House of Representatives
 Speaker of the House  James Wilson Henderson, Democrat

Members

Senate
Members of the Texas Senate for the Second Texas Legislature:

  Bourland was a floating senator "conjointly" elected from Bowie, Red River, Fannin, and Lamar counties

House of Representatives
Members of the House of Representatives for the Second Texas Legislature:

 James Armstrong
 John D. Anderson
 William H. Bourland, Democrat
 Jacob De Cordova
 Benjamin Holland Epperson
 Samuel G. Haynie
 James Wilson Henderson, Democrat
 Charles G. Keenan, Democrat
 Mirabeau B. Lamar
 Emory Rains, Democrat
 John Henninger Reagan, Democrat
 Thomas Jefferson Shannon
 Adolphus Sterne
 James Truitt, Democrat

Membership Changes

Senate

References

External links

2
1847 in Texas
1848 in Texas
1847 U.S. legislative sessions
1848 U.S. legislative sessions